Huddersfield YM Rugby Union Football Club is an English rugby union team based in Huddersfield, West Yorkshire. It runs four senior men sides, a full set of junior teams as well as a women's team.

History 
The Rugby Club was formed in 1927 by 6 YMCA members, who had up till then been playing their rugby for Huddersfield RUFC. The ground and clubhouse are still on the original site, although there have been a number of changes since 1927.

A concrete Club House was built and opened in 1975 with this being replaced by the present building, “The Lawrence Batley Centre” which was built and opened in 1995. Prior to these and during redevelopment projects, players were fed and watered in a number local of hostelries including the White Swan & Packhorse Mews, Spotted Cow, Dusty Miller and Wappy Spring. The main pitch was opened in 1989 with the “Lawrence Batley Stand” following in 1996. The stand was renamed in 2016 to “The Thomas Crapper Stand” following sponsorship by the company.

A Junior Section started during the summer of 1971. The 2012/13 season marked the 40th anniversary of the junior section.

In 2018, the club's first women's team started called the Senior Roses ,and added to the growing women and girls section at the club. The women's team currently boasts approximately 30 registered players. The Senior Roses played their 19/20 season within the new Inner Warrior Challenge Series Borders The women and girls section play at a development level, hosting festivals, pitch up and plays and boot camps.

Social Fitness and Mental Health 
As a community rugby club, Huddersfield YM RUFC has a focus around social fitness and the benefits of sport in improving and reducing the stigma of mental health.

The club runs social fitness under the O2 Touch Rugby scheme. The club's O2 Touch is aimed at mixed genders from years 14+ and focuses on fun rather than competition

In 2020, the club signed the Mental Health Charter for Sport and Recreation

Senior Training
All players aged between 18 & 45 are welcome to come along to senior training, regardless of experience.

Training Times

Men's: Tuesday: 18:45 – 20:30 Thursday: 18:45 – 20:30

Women's: Monday: 19:00 - 20:30

Location

Laund Hill Stadium, Huddersfield, West Yorkshire, HD3 3XF

Facilities
Laund Hill Stadium is an RFU Gold Standard facility set within 18 acres of finely manicured sports grounds. It has 10 playing fields with a first team pitch overlooked by “The Thomas Crapper Stand” which can seat up to 1,000 people. The clubhouse boasts a sports bar and a suite for functions.
From late 2021, the first team stadium is also home to Huddersfield Giants' Reserves, Academy, Scholarship and Women's teams.

Honours
League

Yorkshire 3 Champions: 1996–97
Yorkshire 2 Champions (2): 1997–98, 2001–02
Yorkshire 1 Champions: 1998–99
Durham/Northumberland 1 v Yorkshire 1 promotion playoff Winners: 2012–13
North 1 (east v west) promotion playoff Winners: 2013–14

Cup

Yorkshire Silver Trophy Winners (2): 1982–83, 1995–96
Yorkshire Cable Shield Runners-up: 1996–97
Yorkshire Shield Winners: 1997–98
RFU Junior Tetley Bitter Vase Winners: 1997–98

References

External links
Official club website

English rugby union teams
Rugby clubs established in 1927
Sports clubs founded by the YMCA
Sports clubs in Huddersfield
Sports venues in Huddersfield